Callow Hill is a hill near the village of Lower Dinchope between Craven Arms and Ludlow in the English county of Shropshire. Its summit marks the highest point along the 31 kilometre length of Wenlock Edge.

On the skyline is a square tower known as Flounders' Folly.

References

Hills of Shropshire
Craven Arms